The 16th Washington D.C. Area Film Critics Association Awards were announced on December 8, 2017.

Winners and nominees

Best Film
 Get Out
 Call Me by Your Name
 Dunkirk
 Lady Bird
 Three Billboards Outside Ebbing, Missouri

Best Director
 Christopher Nolan – Dunkirk
 Guillermo del Toro – The Shape of Water
 Greta Gerwig – Lady Bird
 Jordan Peele – Get Out
 Dee Rees – Mudbound

Best Actor
 Gary Oldman – Darkest Hour
 Timothée Chalamet – Call Me by Your Name
 Daniel Day-Lewis – Phantom Thread
 James Franco – The Disaster Artist
 Daniel Kaluuya – Get Out

Best Actress
 Frances McDormand – Three Billboards Outside Ebbing, Missouri
 Sally Hawkins – The Shape of Water
 Margot Robbie – I, Tonya
 Saoirse Ronan – Lady Bird
 Meryl Streep – The Post

Best Supporting Actor
 Sam Rockwell – Three Billboards Outside Ebbing, Missouri
 Willem Dafoe – The Florida Project
 Armie Hammer – Call Me by Your Name
 Jason Mitchell – Mudbound
 Michael Stuhlbarg – Call Me by Your Name

Best Supporting Actress
 Laurie Metcalf – Lady Bird
 Mary J. Blige – Mudbound
 Tiffany Haddish – Girls Trip
 Holly Hunter – The Big Sick
 Allison Janney – I, Tonya

Best Adapted Screenplay
 Virgil Williams and Dee Rees – Mudbound
 Hampton Fancher and Michael Green, story by Hampton Fancher – Blade Runner 2049
 James Ivory – Call Me by Your Name
 Scott Neustadter and Michael H. Weber – The Disaster Artist
 Aaron Sorkin – Molly's Game

Best Original Screenplay
 Jordan Peele – Get Out
 Guillermo del Toro and Vanessa Taylor – The Shape of Water
 Greta Gerwig – Lady Bird
 Emily V. Gordon and Kumail Nanjiani – The Big Sick
 Martin McDonagh – Three Billboards Outside Ebbing, Missouri

Best Ensemble
 Three Billboards Outside Ebbing, Missouri – Frances McDormand, Woody Harrelson, Sam Rockwell, John Hawkes, Peter Dinklage, Lucas Hedges, Abbie Cornish, Samara Weaving, Caleb Landry Jones, Clarke Peters, Darrell Britt-Gibson, Kathryn Newton, Kerry Condon, and Željko Ivanek Dunkirk – Fionn Whitehead, Tom Glynn-Carney, Jack Lowden, Harry Styles, Aneurin Barnard, James D'Arcy, Barry Keoghan, Kenneth Branagh, Cillian Murphy, Mark Rylance, and Tom Hardy
 It – Jaeden Lieberher, Bill Skarsgård, Wyatt Oleff, Jeremy Ray Taylor, Sophia Lillis, Finn Wolfhard, Jack Dylan Grazer, Chosen Jacobs, Nicholas Hamilton, and Jackson Robert Scott
 Mudbound – Carey Mulligan, Garrett Hedlund, Jason Clarke, Jason Mitchell, Mary J. Blige, Jonathan Banks, and Rob Morgan
 The Post – Meryl Streep, Tom Hanks, Sarah Paulson, Bob Odenkirk, Tracy Letts, Bradley Whitford, Bruce Greenwood, Carrie Coon, and Matthew RhysBest Animated Feature Coco
 The Breadwinner
 Despicable Me 3
 The Lego Batman Movie
 Loving Vincent
 The Boss Baby
 Cars 3

Best Documentary Film
 Jane
 City of Ghosts
 Faces Places
 An Inconvenient Sequel: Truth to Power
 Step

Best Foreign Language Film
 BPM (Beats per Minute) • France First They Killed My Father • Cambodia
 In the Fade • Germany
 The Square • Sweden
 Thelma • NorwayBest Cinematography Roger Deakins – Blade Runner 2049
 Dan Laustsen – The Shape of Water
 Rachel Morrison – Mudbound
 Sayombhu Mukdeeprom – Call Me by Your Name
 Hoyte van Hoytema – Dunkirk

Best Editing
 Paul Machliss and Jonathan Amos – Baby Driver
 Gregory Plotkin – Get Out
 Lee Smith – Dunkirk
 Joe Walker – Blade Runner 2049
 Sidney Wolinsky – The Shape of Water

Best Original Score
 Hans Zimmer and Benjamin Wallfisch – Blade Runner 2049
 Carter Burwell – Three Billboards Outside Ebbing, Missouri
 Alexandre Desplat – The Shape of Water
 Michael Giacchino – Coco
 Hans Zimmer – Dunkirk

Best Production Design
 Dennis Gassner (production design) and Alessandra Querzola (set decoration) – Blade Runner 2049
 Paul Denham Austerberry (production design), Shane Vieau (set decoration), and Jeff Melvin (set decoration) – The Shape of Water
 Aline Bonetto (production design) and Anna Lynch-Robinson (set decoration) – Wonder Woman
 Nathan Crowley (production design) and Gary Fettis (set decoration) – Dunkirk
 Sarah Greenwood (production design) and Katie Spencer (set decoration) – Beauty and the Beast

Best Youth Performance
 Brooklynn Prince – The Florida Project
 Dafne Keen – Logan
 Sophia Lillis – It
 Millicent Simmonds – Wonderstruck
 Jacob Tremblay – Wonder

Best Animated Voice Performance
 Anthony Gonzalez – Coco
 Will Arnett – The Lego Batman Movie
 Gael García Bernal – Coco
 Michael Cera – The Lego Batman Movie
 Bradley Cooper – Guardians of the Galaxy Vol. 2

Best Motion Capture Performance
 Andy Serkis – War for the Planet of the Apes
 Dan Stevens – Beauty and the Beast
 Steve Zahn – War for the Planet of the Apes
 Taika Waititi – Thor: Ragnarok

The Joe Barber Award for Best Portrayal of Washington, D.C.
 The Post
 An Inconvenient Sequel: Truth to Power
 Last Flag Flying
 Mark Felt: The Man Who Brought Down the White House
 Spider-Man: Homecoming

Multiple nominations and awards

These films had multiple nominations:

 7 nominations: Dunkirk and The Shape of Water
 6 nominations: Call Me by Your Name, Mudbound, and Three Billboards Outside Ebbing, Missouri
 5 nominations: Blade Runner 2049, Get Out, and Lady Bird
 4 nominations: Coco
 3 nominations: The Lego Batman Movie
 2 nominations: An Inconvenient Sequel: Truth to Power, The Big Sick, Beauty and the Beast, The Disaster Artist, The Florida Project, It, I, Tonya, The Post, and War for the Planet of the Apes

The following films received multiple awards:

 3 wins: Blade Runner 2049 and Three Billboards Outside Ebbing, Missouri
 2 wins: Coco and Get Out

References

External links
 The Washington D.C. Area Film Critics Association

2017
2017 film awards